The Beverage Container Refund Scheme, often shortened to BCRS is a container refund scheme currently active in Malta. The scheme first started on November 14, 2022 and is set to continue indefinitely. With the addition of the scheme, a price of 10c has been added to all applicable containers when they are purchased originally. Producers of applicable containers have also been forced to register with BCRS as per recent Maltese legislature.

Usage 
The reverse vending machines accept single-use plastic beverage containers and give a EUR 00.10 credit for each container. The credit will then be outputted in the form of a receipt which can be used either pay at a specific grocery shop.

Reception 
Within the first 2 hours after the scheme was opened in the late hours of the 14 November, 2,000 containers had been deposited. By the end of the first full day, 50,000 were added onto that. By 21 November, 1 million containers had been put trough the scheme.

Notes

References 

Recycling